The Prohibition of Political Interference Act, 1968 (Act No. 51 of 1968, which was also known as the Prohibition of Improper Interference Act, and was later renamed the Prohibition of Foreign Financing of Political Parties Act), was a piece of apartheid legislation in South Africa that sought to prevent racial groups from collaborating with each other for a political purpose. This act is thought to have been enacted by the ruling apartheid government to prevent the strong growth of the Liberal Party of South Africa (LPSA), which were made up of South Africans of various races who were against the racially divisive policies of the Apartheid regime government.

The Liberal Party of South Africa was formed in 1953 when various groups of anti apartheid activists joined together to form a political party. Initially referred to as the South African Liberation Association, the party sought to repeal racially discriminating legislation and ensure access to health care, access to quality education, voting rights and equal human rights for South Africans of all races.

Consequence of Legislation
With the enactment of the act, the Liberal Party, being a multi-racial party, was outlawed and forced to either disband or go underground. The party chose to disband during meetings in April and May 1968 shortly after the enactment of the legislation. The majority of the Members of the party however continued to fight against the Apartheid system until its end in 1994.

The act also prohibited parties from receiving funding or donations from foreign organisations or people.

Repeal
The sections of the act prohibiting multi-racial political parties were repealed (along with several other apartheid laws) by the Constitutional Affairs Amendment Act, 1985; at that time the act was also renamed. The repealing of the Act was as a direct result of increased political and financial pressure on the National Party of South Africa to end its racially divisive policies.

The remaining sections of the act were repealed by the Abolition of Restrictions on Free Political Activity Act, 1993.

See also
 :Category:Apartheid laws in South Africa
 Apartheid in South Africa

References

External links
 African History: Apartheid Legislation in South Africa
 
 Collection of essays and so forth by Alan Paton compiled together by E Callan, although regarded and shelfed (at the Rhodes University Library) under Paton as author.
 
 

Apartheid laws in South Africa
1968 in South African law